9beta-pimara-7,15-diene oxidase (CYP99A3) is an enzyme with systematic name 9beta-pimara-7,15-diene,NADPH:oxygen 19-oxidoreductase. This enzyme catalyses the following chemical reaction

 9beta-pimara-7,15-diene + 3 O2 + 3 NADPH + 3 H+  9beta-pimara-7,15-dien-19-oate + 3 NADP+ + 4 H2O (overall reaction)
(1a) 9beta-pimara-7,15-diene + O2 + NADPH + H+  9beta-pimara-7,15-dien-19-ol + NADP+ + H2O
(1b) 9beta-pimara-7,15-dien-19-ol + O2 + NADPH + H+  9beta-pimara-7,15-dien-19-al + NADP+ + 2 H2O
(1c) 9beta-pimara-7,15-dien-19-al + O2 + NADPH + H+  9beta-pimara-7,15-dien-19-oate + NADP+ + H2O

9beta-pimara-7,15-diene oxidase requires cytochrome P450.

References

External links 
 

EC 1.14.13